Aurora Publishing may refer to:

 Aurora Publishing (United States), American publishing company of Japanese manga
 Aurora Publishing (Hungary), German-Hungarian publishing company